Robinson House may refer to:

Judge Elisha Robinson House, Ashville, Alabama
John Robinson House, Huntsville, Alabama
Mrs. William Robinson House, Huntsville, Alabama
Collins-Robinson House, Mobile, Alabama
Chambers-Robinson House, Sheffield, Alabama
Dr. Robinson House, Leslie, Arkansas
Joseph Taylor Robinson House, Little Rock, Arkansas
Pearson-Robinson House, Little Rock, Arkansas
Virginia Robinson Estate, Beverly Hills, California
Elias H. Robinson House, Santa Cruz, California, listed on the National Register of Historic Places
Robinson House (Denver, Colorado), listed on the National Register of Historic Places
Robinson House (Louisville, Colorado)
Robinson House (Claymont, Delaware)
Jesse Robinson House (Seaford, Delaware)
Robinson-Stewart House, Carmi, Illinois
Robinson House (Maywood, Illinois)
William Robinson House (Sycamore, Illinois)
Horney Robinson House, Fort Wayne, Indiana
Allison-Robinson House, Spencer, Indiana
Sage-Robinson-Nagel House, Terre Haute, Indiana
James Robinson House (Mitchellsburg, Kentucky), listed on the National Register of Historic Places
Robinson Hall-Louisiana Tech University, Ruston, Louisiana, listed on the National Register of Historic Places
William A. Robinson House, Auburn, Maine
Edwin Arlington Robinson House, Gardiner, Maine
Robinson-Parsons Farm, Paris, Maine
Seavey-Robinson House, South Portland, Maine
 Robinson House (Severna Park, Maryland)
Robinson-Lewis-G. F. Fessenden House, Arlington, Massachusetts
Robinson House (Arlington, Massachusetts)
Capt. Joel Robinson House, Attleboro, Massachusetts
Robinson House (Williamstown, Massachusetts), listed on the National Register of Historic Places
Robinson House (Muir, Michigan), listed on the National Register of Historic Places
Leonard Robinson House, Sauk Rapids, Minnesota, listed on the National Register of Historic Places
George R. and Elsie Robinson House, Kirkwood, Missouri, listed on the National Register of Historic Places
William P. Robinson House, Lexington, Missouri
Lizzie Robinson House, North Omaha, Nebraska
J. C. Robinson House, Waterloo, Nebraska, listed on the National Register of Historic Places
John Roosevelt "Jackie" Robinson House, New York, New York
Robinson Rock House Ruin and Plantation Site, Charlotte, North Carolina
Col. William H. Robinson House, Mayville, North Dakota
Byron W. Robinson House, Akron, Ohio, listed on the National Register of Historic Places
Edmund Robinson House, Lebanon, Ohio, listed on the National Register of Historic Places
Robinson-Pavey House, Washington Court House, Ohio
Spies–Robinson House, Portland, Oregon
Jesse Robinson House (Wellsboro, Pennsylvania)
Robinson House (Wellsboro, Pennsylvania)
Robinson-Hiller House, Chapin, South Carolina
Robinson-Macken House, Austin, Texas
Florence Robinson Cottage, Hawkins, Texas
Daniel Webster Robinson House, Burlington, Vermont
James E. Robinson House, Beaver, Utah, listed on the National Register of Historic Places
William Robinson House (300 West, Beaver, Utah), listed on the National Register of Historic Places
William Robinson House (State Route 153, Beaver, Utah), listed on the National Register of Historic Places
Robinson House (Richmond, Virginia)
Robinson House (Manassas, Virginia)
Hedges-Robinson-Myers House, Hedgesville, West Virginia
Robinson-Tabb House, Martinsburg, West Virginia
Charles Robinson House, Greenbush, Wisconsin

See also
James Robinson House (disambiguation)
Jesse Robinson House (disambiguation)
William Robinson House (disambiguation)